Mr. Shing-A-Ling is an album by jazz saxophonist Lou Donaldson recorded for the Blue Note label in 1967 and featuring Donaldson with Blue Mitchell, Lonnie Smith, Jimmy Ponder, and Leo Morris (better known as Idris Muhammad).

Track listing 
All compositions by Lou Donaldson except as indicated

 "Ode to Billie Joe" (Bobbie Gentry) - 6:33
 "The Humpback" - 5:28
 "The Shadow of Your Smile" (Johnny Mandel, Paul Francis Webster) - 6:25
 "Peepin'" (Lonnie Smith) - 8:21
 "The Kid" (Harold Ousley) - 10:59

Personnel 
 Lou Donaldson - alto saxophone
 Blue Mitchell - trumpet (#2-5)
 Lonnie Smith - organ
 Jimmy Ponder - guitar
 Leo Morris - drums

References

External links 
 

Lou Donaldson albums
1968 albums
Albums produced by Francis Wolff
Blue Note Records albums
Albums recorded at Van Gelder Studio